Paul Gregory Bootkoski (born July 4, 1940) is an American prelate of the Roman Catholic Church.  Bootkoski served as bishop of the Diocese of Metuchen in New Jersey from 2002 until March 8, 2016; he was replaced by Monsignor James Checchio. Bootkoski previously served as an auxiliary bishop of the Archdiocese of Newark in New Jersey from 1997 to 2002.

Biography

Early years 
Bootkoski was born in Newark, New Jersey on July 4, 1940, to Peter and Antoinette Bootkoski.  He attended Our Lady Queen of Peace School before continuing at St. Benedict's Preparatory School, both in Newark. After graduating from Seton Hall University in South Orange, New Jersey, with a degree in classical languages, Bootkoski entered Immaculate Conception Seminary at the university.  He also received a Master of Education degree from Manhattan College in New York City.

Priesthood 
On May 28, 1966, Bootkoski was ordained as a priest for the Archdiocese of Newark by Archbishop Thomas Boland.  In 1980, Bootkoski was appointed assistant vice president for student affairs at Seton Hall. In 1983, He became pastor of St. Mary of the Assumption Parish in Elizabeth, New Jersey and was named by the Vatican as an honorary prelatewith the title of monsignor in 1991.

Auxiliary Bishop of Newark 
On July 8, 1997, Pope Paul II appointed Bootkoski as an auxiliary bishop of the Archdiocese of Newark.  He was consecrated by then Archbishop Theodore E. McCarrick on Sept. 5, 1997, at the Cathedral Basilica of the Sacred Heart in Newark.

Bootkoski became vicar general of the diocese and on Jan. 5, 2001, diocesan administrator when McCarrick was appointed archbishop of the Archdiocese of  Washington.

Bishop of Metuchen 
On January 4, 2002, Paul II appointed Bootkoski as the fourth bishop of the Diocese of Metuchen. He was installed on March 19, 2002.

On January 31, 2003,  Bootkoski approved an $800,000 settlement to ten people who had alleged sexual abuse when they were minors by five diocesan priests. In 2005 and 2007, the Diocese of Metuchen and the Archdiocese of Newark paid financial settlements to two priests who had accused McCarrick of abuse.  According to Cardinal Donald Wuerl, nobody from the Diocese of Metuchen informed him of these settlements, even after the retired McCarrick began living on the grounds of a seminary in the Archdiocese of Washington.

Retirement 
Having passed the normal retirement age of 75, Bootkoski's resignation as bishop of the Diocese of Metuchen was accepted by Pope Francis on March 8, 2016.

In 2018, Archbishop Carlo Viganò accused Bootkoski of assisting in a coverup of sexual abuse acts by McCarrick.  In reply, Bootkoski said that Viganò's memory was faulty and that Bootkoski had reported the allegations of abuse from three priests against McCarrick to the Vatican in 2005. On November 10, 2020, the Vatican published the McCarrick Report, an investigation into the McCarrick case.  The report verified that Bootkoski reported McCarrick in 2005.

See also
 

 Catholic Church hierarchy
 Catholic Church in the United States
 Historical list of the Catholic bishops of the United States
 List of Catholic bishops of the United States
 Lists of patriarchs, archbishops, and bishops

References

External links
Roman Catholic Diocese of Metuchen Official Site

Episcopal succession

1940 births
Living people
Seton Hall University alumni
21st-century Roman Catholic bishops in the United States
Clergy from Newark, New Jersey